Paissandu Atlético Clube, commonly known as Paissandu, is a sports club from the Brazilian metropolis of Rio de Janeiro. Initially the club was based in the Rua Paissandu in the neighborhood of Laranjeiras. Since 1953 it is at home in the neighborhood of Leblon.

Nowadays Paissandu hosts a wide range of sports and social activities, including bowls, cross training, dancing, darts, futsal, gymnastics, pilates, squash, swimming, tennis, water aerobics, weight training, and yoga.

The football team of the club participated from 1906 to 1914 in the Championship of Rio de Janeiro and won the competition in 1912.

History
Paissandu was founded on July 29, 1906 as Paysandu Cricket Club. The football team of Paysandu played 73 Campeonato Carioca games between 1906 and 1914. They won the Campeonato Carioca in 1912, defeating CR Flamengo in the final. The club closed its football department in 1914, and eventually was renamed to Paissandu Atlético Clube.

Achievements

 Campeonato Carioca:
 Winners (1): 1912

References

External links
 Official website

Association football clubs established in 1872
Association football clubs disestablished in 1914
Defunct football clubs in Rio de Janeiro (state)
Football clubs in Rio de Janeiro (city)
1872 establishments in Brazil
1914 disestablishments in Brazil
Football clubs in Rio de Janeiro (state)